John Burdett Wittenoom (24 October 1788 –  23 January 1855) was a colonial clergyman who was the second Anglican clergyman to perform religious services in the Swan River Colony, Australia, soon after its establishment in 1829.

Biography

Early life
John Burdett Wittenoom was born in England at Newark-on-Trent, Nottinghamshire. He was educated at Winchester College and matriculated to Brasenose College, Oxford in 1807, graduating B.A. in 1810, M.A. in 1813. He was ordained deacon in the Church of England in 1811, priest in 1812.

Career
He took up teaching in England where he was appointed headmaster of Newark Grammar School. Shortly after his first wife's death, he decided to emigrate to Western Australia arriving on the Wanstead in January 1830 with his mother, sister and four sons.

He singlehandedly conducted services alternately every Sunday at Perth, Guildford and Fremantle until 1836.

In later years, he ran a grammar school and pursued his interest in education. In 1847, he was appointed to the colony's first education committee and was the inaugural chairman for eight years after it became the Board of Education. After his death in 1855, his second wife and daughter took charge of the government girls' school.

Personal life
His first wife died when they were still living in England. Together, they had five sons, including John Burdett, Henry, Frederick Dirck, and Charles. In 1839, he remarried in Australia. His daughter Mary was the mother of Edith Cowan, while another daughter, Augusta, married Thomas Burges (a member of parliament). The progeny of Wittenoom's fifth son, Charles Wittenoom, became notable individuals in the history of Western Australia.

Death
He died on 23 January 1855. A tablet in his memory is in St George's Cathedral, Perth.

See also
Wittenoom (disambiguation)

References

Notes

Settlers of Western Australia
Australian Anglican priests
19th-century English Anglican priests
People from Newark-on-Trent
People educated at Winchester College
Alumni of Brasenose College, Oxford
1788 births
1855 deaths